Karthik Anitha is a 2009 Tamil language romance film directed by Srihari. The film stars newcomers Rathan Trivikrama and Manju, with Kota Srinivasa Rao, Rajan P. Dev, Abhinay, Bala, Vishnu, Nihal, Singamuthu, Crane Manohar and Lollu Sabha Manohar playing supporting roles. The film, produced by Shankar V. Raajhan, was released on 10 April 2009.

Plot

Karthik (Rathan Trivikrama) lives with his widower father Ramachandramoorthy (Kota Srinivasa Rao) who spoils him since the death of his mother. Anitha (Manju) is his neighbour who lives with her parents and little sister in the neighbouring house in the same apartments. Karthik and Anitha are childhood friends and even study at the same college, moreover, their fathers Ramachandramoorthy and Krishnamoorthy (Rajan P. Dev) are like brothers. However, Karthik and Anitha are constantly squabbling like children and playing pranks on each other. But one day, a prank went wrong and Karthik gets suspended from college thus he starts hating Anitha.

Thereafter, Anitha's wedding is fixed with the wealthy engineer Gowri Shankar (Abhinay) and Ramachandramoorthy was the one who made both families agree. It was only then that Anitha realises her love for Karthik. Anitha then briefs Karthik about her wedding and expected him to declare his love for her, Karthik, for its part, manifested his happiness making fun of her.

Karthik then realises his love for Anitha and tries to apologise to her but she keeps ignoring him. He even wrote "Karthik loves Anitha" on a ten rupee note that she had gifted him once for his birthday. When his father finds the currency note one night, he felt guilty at not being able to understand his son's feelings and the next morning, Karthik finds his father dead with the note in his hand. Anitha's family asks Karthik, who was consumed and distressed by the death of his father, to move in with them for a few days. At her home, he is still unable to express his love. Karthik finds a job in Bangalore and has to leave them just a few days before Anitha's wedding, thus he will miss Anitha's marriage. After he left, Anitha finds the currency note and starts to tear up. After thinking for a while, Krishnamoorthy cancels the wedding for the good of his daughter and wants Karthik to be his son-in-law. The film ends with Karthik and Anitha romancing via mobile phones and they are looking forward to their wedding.

Cast

Rathan Trivikrama as Karthik
Manju as Anitha
Kota Srinivasa Rao as Ramachandramoorthy, Karthik's father
Rajan P. Dev as Krishnamoorthy, Anitha's father
Abhinay as Gowri Shankar (guest appearance)
Bala as Bala
Vishnu as Kumar
Nihal as Ganesh
Singamuthu as Maths teacher
Crane Manohar as Beggar
Lollu Sabha Manohar as Pappu
R. Sekar as Rajasekhar, Gowri Shankar's father
Sathyapriya as Gowri Shankar's mother
Raviraj as College Principal
Arulmani as Auto-driver
Sampath Ram
Sivanarayanamoorthy
Boys Rajan as College Principal
Mangalam Gurukkal
Aarthi as TV Anchor
Srilatha as Anitha's mother
Suchithra as Kavi, Anitha's sister
Sailaja

Production
Srihari, who was earlier working along with Sundar C., made his directorial debut with this venture. The film, produced under the banner of King Magic, had a totally urban setting and is tagged 'a neighbourhood love-story'. Rathan Trivikrama, a debutant and the son of makeup man Babu, signed to play the hero of the film while Manju, hailing from Kerala, was selected to play the heroine. Kota Srinivasa Rao, known for his villain roles, signed to play the father's role.

Soundtrack

The film score and the soundtrack were composed by Jack Anand. The soundtrack, released in 2009, features 6 tracks with lyrics written by Thamarai, Na. Muthukumar, Yugabharathi and Srinivas. A critic rated the album 2 out of 5 and stated, "This music director should be appreciated for his jaunty spontaneous touches in music interludes".

Release
The film was originally planned to release in February 2009 but was postponed to 10 April 2009.

Critical reception
Sify said, "there is nothing new in the age-old squabbling friends turning lovers plot [...] Karthik Anitha is a refreshingly narrated love story. With no lewd dialogues, item songs or vulgarity it makes for a good, clean film for family viewing". A reviewer rated the film 2.5 out of 5 and stated, "Youth entertainer, can be watched once". Indiaglitz wrote, "The pacy narration without any lag makes the movie interesting. Lending good support to the script are five catchy songs tuned by Jack Anand. K G Shankar and A Velmurugan does a neat job behind the camera" and concluded with, "Karthik Anitha is a good, clean entertainer sure to entertain youngsters". Behindwoods.com rated the film 0.5 out of 5 and  wrote, "Kaartic Anithaa is a rerun of an often repeated theme of love that is unexpressed. A loose and predictable screenplay by the director Sri Hari is the major pitfall of this movie"

Box office
The film took an average opening at the Chennai box office.

References

2009 films
2000s Tamil-language films
Indian romance films
2009 directorial debut films
2009 romance films